In mathematics, and especially in order theory, a nucleus  is a function  on a meet-semilattice  such that (for every  in ):

 
 
 

Every nucleus is evidently a monotone function.

Frames and locales
Usually, the term nucleus is used in frames and locales theory (when the semilattice  is a frame).

References

Order theory